Velvet gecko can refer to any of the following gecko genera. Some genera are endemic to Australia, while others are endemic to Madagascar. :
Family Diplodactylidae
 Amalosia
 Robust velvet gecko, Nebulifera robusta
 Oedura
 Reticulated velvet gecko, Hesperoedura reticulata
Family Gekkonidae
Homopholis
Blaesodactylus